This is the episode guide of K.O.3an Guo (終極三國). It currently airs on GTV and FTV.  Click here to visit the episode guides of the first series KO One (終極一班) and the second series The X-Family (終極一家).

Episode list

Season 1

Season 2

Season 3
Last Season of K.0. 3anguoEpisode 52 should be Ah Xiang regain consciousness than they were trap in illusion space

References

Lists of Taiwanese television series episodes